Haslam is a town and a locality in the Australian state of South Australia located on the Eyre Peninsula on the coastline of Streaky Bay about  north-west of the state capital of Adelaide and about  north of the municipal seat of Streaky Bay.

Haslam is a common stop off for campers as they make their way across the Nullarbor Plain. The town itself has no major industrial or commercial connections anymore and contains limited resources including a camping ground and the town jetty.

History 
Haslam was established in 1893 as a deep sea port reportedly under the name of Port Carawa to allow the shipping of supplies of machinery and food to the local settlers, as well as providing transport of local products to other parts of the state. When road transport took over in the 1960s, this service died out.

The town was proclaimed on 9 October 1913 and takes its name from William Haslam who served as the north-east representative of the South Australian Legislative Council from 1891 to his death in 1898.

Haslam had a post office (originally a receiving office under the name Port Haslam) from 1913. The area is now served by a community postal agency.

It was reduced in length by half in 1972.

The Haslam Township School opened in 1920, before having its name changed to "Maildaburra" in 1921. A new school was built in 1930, and was renamed "Haslam". The school finally closed on the opening of Miltaburra Area School near Wirrulla in 1983, and now serves as a museum.

On 15 March 1934, the area of the town was extended by proclamation to include a "police reserve".

The locality's boundaries which were created on 12 April 2001 includes the government town of Haslam.

Governance
Haslam is located within the federal division of Grey, the state electoral district of Flinders and the local government area of the District Council of Streaky Bay.

See also
 Caratoola Recreation Park

References

External links
 Streaky Bay Council
 Article in The Age about Streaky Bay and surrounding districts
 Haslam UNPATROLLED BEACH

Coastal towns in South Australia
Eyre Peninsula